The Manila Memorial Park – Sucat (MMP–Sucat) is a cemetery situated along Dr. A. Santos Avenue (Sucat Road) in Parañaque, Metro Manila, Philippines.

History
The Manila Memorial Park in Parañaque was established in 1964 when the city was still a municipality of Rizal province. In August 1985, it became the first cemetery to host a modern crematorium in a memorial park setting, having been established a year after Pope Paul VI lifted the ban on cremation for Catholics. The cemetery became part of a larger network of burial sites of Manila Memorial Park, Inc. with five other cemeteries under the Manila Memorial Park brand opened in other parts of the Philippines.

From December 2016 to August 2017, the Rizal Premier Chapel, a new funeral venue was built. The cemetery hosts a second older chapel.

The Manila Memorial Park was plot setting in the drama film Yesterday, Today, Tomorrow in 2011.

Notable burials

The Manila Memorial Park is the site of burial of several Filipino notable individuals which includes politicians, actors, and athletes.
 Jum Jainudin Akbar (1963–2016), former Governor of Basilan
 Nereo Andolong (1926–2001), former chairman and general manager of the Philippine Charity Sweepstakes Office and president of Philippine Olympic Committee
 Alfie Anido (1959–1981), actor
 Jun Aristorenas (1933–2000), actor and director
 Teroy De Guzman (1920–1991), actor
 Benigno Aquino Jr. (1932–1983), senator of the Philippines
 Corazon Aquino (1933–2009), 11th president of the Philippines
 Benigno Aquino III (1960–2021), 15th president of the Philippines
 Robert Barbers (1944–2005), senator of the Philippines
 Roberto Benedicto (1917–2000), former ambassador
 Lourdes Carvajal (1944–2003), radio/TV host and journalist
 Bayani Casimiro, Sr. (1918–1989), dancer and actor
 Mariano Contreras (1910–1978), comedian
 Pablo Cuneta (1910–2000), former mayor of Pasay
 Paquito Diaz (1932–2011), actor and director
 Gabriel Elorde (1935–1985), professional boxer
 John Gokongwei, Jr. (1926–2019), businessman
 Maita Gomez (1947–2012), beauty queen and women's rights advocate
 Arsenio Laurel (1931–1967), race car driver
 Sotero Laurel (1918–2009), senator of the Philippines
 Maria Clara Lobregat (1921–2004), former mayor of Zamboanga City
 Eugenio Lopez Jr. (1928–1999), chairman of ABS-CBN Corporation
 Gina Lopez (1953–2019), secretary of Department of Environment and Natural Resources
 Ike Lozada (1940–1995), comedian
 Anita Linda (1924–2020), actress
 Percival Mabasa (1959–2022), radio broadcaster and journalist
 Diomedes Maturan (1940–2002), singer
 Leandro Mendoza (1946–2013), former secretary of Transportation and chief of the Philippine National Police
 Pitoy Moreno (1925–2018), fashion designer
 Tita Muñoz (1927–2009), actress
 Ronnie Nathanielsz (1935–2016), sports journalist
 Fred Panopio (1939–2010), singer
 AJ Perez (1993–2011), actor
 Eddie Peregrina (1944–1977), singer
 Kerima Polotan–Tuvera (1925–2011), journalist
 Orly Punzalan (1935–2005), radio/TV host and news anchor
 Narciso Ramos (1900–1986), former minister of Foreign Affairs
 Leticia Ramos–Shahani (1929–2017), senator of the Philippines
 Rene Requiestas (1957–1993), actor and comedian
 Miguel Rodriguez (1962–1997), actor; his remains were later transferred at Alabang Church Columbarium
 Dulce Saguisag (1943–2007), former secretary of Social Welfare and Development; wife of former senator Rene Saguisag
 Jam Sebastian, (1986–2015), actor and internet personality
 Roy Señeres (1947–2016), politician and 2016 presidential candidate
 Rosario Silayan-Bailon (1959–2006), beauty queen and actress
 Vic Silayan (1929–1987), actor
 Charito Solis (1935–1998), actress
 Helen Vela (1946–1992), actress and radio/TV host and news anchor
 Nestor de Villa (1928–2004), actor
 Luis Villafuerte, Sr. (1935–2021), former Governor of Camarines Sur
 Manuel Yan (1920–2008), World War II veteran; former AFP Chief of Staff and Secretary of Foreign Affairs
 Rico Yan (1975–2002), actor
 Emilio Yap (1925–2014), businessman and philanthropist
 Alfonso Yuchengco (1923–2017), businessman
 Rey Cuenco (1962–1996), basketball player
 Pocholo Ramirez (1933–2009), raicing driver
 Rolando Galman (1953–1983), alleged assassin of Benigno S. Aquino, Jr.

References

Cemeteries in Metro Manila
Landmarks in the Philippines
Buildings and structures in Parañaque
1964 establishments in the Philippines